Mafalda Theotto (September 18, 1924 – May 16, 2018), known professionally as Eloísa Mafalda,  was a Brazilian actress.

Selected filmography
 O Ébrio (1965)
 A Grande Mentira (1968)
 Pigmalião 70 (1970)
 A Cabana do Pai Tomás (1970)
 A Próxima Atração (1971)
 Bandeira 2 (1971)
 O Cafona (1971)
 O Bofe (1972)
 A Grande Família (1972-1975)
 Gabriela, Cravo e Canela (1975)
 O Grito (1975)
 Saramandaia (1976)
 O Astro (1977)
 Locomotivas (1977)
 Pecado Rasgado (1978)
 Água Viva (1980)
 Plumas e Paetês (1980)
 Brilhante (1981)
 Paraíso (1982)
 Champagne (1983)
 Corpo a Corpo (1984)
 Roque Santeiro (1985)
 Hipertensão (1986)
 Expresso Brasil (1987)
 Vida Nova (1988)
 O Sexo dos Anjos (1989)
 A, E, I, O... Urca (1990)
 Araponga (1990)
 Você Decide (1995-1999)
 Pedra sobre Pedra (1992)
 Mulheres de Areia (1993)
 A Madona de Cedro (1994)
 A Vida como Ela é... (1996)
 Quem É Você? (1996)
 Por Amor (1997)
 Meu Bem Querer (1998)
 Hilda Furacão (1998)
 Labirinto (1998)
 Aquarela do Brasil (2000)
 Brava Gente (2001)
 Porto dos Milagres (2001)
 O Clone (2001)
 O Beijo do Vampiro (2002)

References

External links
 

1924 births
2018 deaths
People from Jundiaí
Brazilian television actresses
Brazilian telenovela actresses